The Samsung Ativ Tab 7, XE700T1C or previously known as Samsung Ativ Smart PC Pro, is a  tablet manufactured by Samsung. The Ativ Tab 7 was announced on August 29, 2012 at IFA 2012 in Berlin, incorporates a dual-core 1.8 GHz Intel Core i5 - 3337U processor, and runs the Windows 8 operating system.

The incorporation of Windows 8 has received mostly favourable reviews. Also the Ativ Tab 7 itself received positive reviews for its lightweight design, inclusion of S-Pen, and its overall performance for a device positioned as a high-end device.

Hardware
The design of the Ativ Tab 7 is relatively similar to its smaller Android-based counterparts (such as the Galaxy Tab 2 10.1 and the Galaxy Note 10.1)built using a mixture of plastic and glass. A micro HDMI port, MicroSD slot, and a full-size USB port are incorporated into the design, as well as a volume rocker, power button, and headphone jack located on the top. A physical Windows button is located directly below the screen. A charging port and dock connector are located on the bottom. The Ativ Tab 7 uses a   LED Full HD display at a resolution of 1920x1080. The tablet is available with either 128 or 256 GB of internal storage which is expandable via an external micro-sd card.

Reception
At IFA 2012, TechRadar praised the Ativ Tab 7's Windows 8 operating system, lightweight design, and the ability to expand its functionality and storage with its S-Pen and attachable keyboard. It was also said that there is a plenty amount of USB ports which was even doubled with the attachment of the removable keyboard.  Overall they deemed the device as one of the best Windows 8 transformer tablets around.

CNET said that the Ativ Tab 7 performs well, most of the time as docked into the removable keyboard. The tablet's battery life, numerous USB ports, and the pre-installed Samsung software were regarded as positive aspectsdespite considering the design itself to be merely cheap and unusual. The Intel chipset used in the Ativ Tab 7 was also judged as a great for the device noting that its performance was fast and very responsive most of the time in comparison to the chipsets used in competing Windows 8 devices. Over-all they viewed the Ativ tab 7 as more of an overpriced and confused Windows 8 ultrabook that is detachable and is better off with a keyboard as it is best left like that.

See also
List of Windows 8 devices
Samsung Ativ

References

Ativ Tab 7
Tablet computers
Tablet computers introduced in 2012

de:Samsung Ativ#Ativ Tab